Vice admiral Gordon Campbell,  (6 January 1886 – 3 October 1953) was a British naval officer, writer, politician and a recipient of the Victoria Cross, the highest award for gallantry in the face of the enemy that can be awarded to British and Commonwealth forces. He was also awarded the Croix de Guerre and appointed a chevalier of the Légion d'honneur for his actions during the First World War.

Early life and career
Born on 6 January 1886 to Frederick Campbell, he was educated at Dulwich College, which he attended between 1898 and 1900. He then joined the Royal Navy and was in October 1902 posted as a midshipman to the battleship  serving in the Mediterranean Sea. He was promoted to lieutenant in 1907 and to commander in March 1916. It was during the First World War that he was awarded the Victoria Cross for the following action:

Campbell also commanded  during the action of 8 August 1917 when she was sunk by SM UC-71. Victoria Crosses were awarded to two members of the crew who were selected by ballot from amongst the crew of Dunraven, Lieutenant Charles George Bonner and Petty Officer Ernest Herbert Pitcher. Campbell received his second Bar to his Distinguished Service Order (DSO).

Later life
Campbell later achieved the rank of vice admiral. He commanded the battlecruiser  from 1925 to 1927 and served as Naval Aide-de-Camp to George V from 1928 to 1929. In 1931, he was elected as National Member of Parliament for Burnley, defeating the Labour leader, Arthur Henderson. In 1935, however, standing as a Liberal National, he lost his seat.

In the Second World War, Campbell was recalled to the Royal Navy and, serving in the rank of commander, was responsible for anti-invasion measures around Padstow.

Campbell wrote several publications, including the successful My Mystery Ships. His brother, Sir Edward Campbell, 1st Baronet, was also a Member of Parliament.

His Victoria Cross is held at his old school, Dulwich College.

References

External links
 
 
  illustrated account of Gordon Campbell, "the most famous Q-ship officer"

1886 births
1953 deaths
Burials in Hampshire
British military writers
British World War I recipients of the Victoria Cross
Chevaliers of the Légion d'honneur
Companions of the Distinguished Service Order
Members of the Parliament of the United Kingdom for English constituencies
National Liberal Party (UK, 1931) politicians
People educated at Dulwich College
People from Croydon
Politics of Burnley
Recipients of the Croix de Guerre 1914–1918 (France)
Royal Navy vice admirals
Royal Navy officers of World War I
Royal Navy recipients of the Victoria Cross
UK MPs 1931–1935
Military personnel from Surrey